Hemidactylus eniangii is a species of forest gecko found in Nigeria (i.e., east of the Dahomey Gap) and northern Cameroon.

References

Further reading

External links

Hemidactylus
Geckos of Africa
Reptiles of Cameroon
Reptiles of Nigeria
Reptiles described in 2014
Taxa named by Philipp Wagner